This is a list of the Austrian number-one singles & albums of 2011.

References

Number-one hits
Austria
2011